Thermal printing (or direct thermal printing) is a digital printing process which produces a printed image by passing paper with a thermochromic coating, commonly known as thermal paper, over a print head consisting of tiny electrically heated elements. The coating turns black in the areas where it is heated, producing an image. 

Most thermal printers are monochrome (black and white) although some two-color designs exist.

Thermal transfer printing is a different method, using plain paper with a heat-sensitive ribbon instead of heat-sensitive paper, but using similar print heads.

Design 

A thermal printer typically contains at least these components:

 Thermal head: Produces heat to create an image on the paper
 Platen: A rubber roller which moves the paper
 Spring: Applies pressure to hold the paper and printhead together

Thermal paper is impregnated with a solid-state mixture of a dye and a suitable matrix, for example, a fluoran leuco dye and an octadecylphosphonic acid. When the matrix is heated above its melting point, the dye reacts with the acid, shifts to its colored form, and the changed form is then conserved in metastable state when the matrix solidifies back quickly enough, a process known as thermochromism.

This process is usually monochrome, but some two-color designs exist, which can print both black and an additional color (often red) by applying heat at two different temperatures.

In order to print, the thermal paper is inserted between the thermal head and the platen and pressed against the head. The printer sends an electric current to the heating elements of the thermal head. The heat generated activates the paper's thermochromic layer, causing it to turn a certain color (for example, black).

Thermal print heads can have a resolution of up to 1,200 dots per inch (dpi). The heating elements are usually arranged as a line of small closely spaced dots.

Early formulations of the thermo-sensitive coating used in thermal paper were sensitive to incidental heat, abrasion, friction (which can cause heat, thus darkening the paper), light (which can fade printed images), and water. Later thermal coating formulations are far more stable; in practice, thermally printed text should remain legible for at least 50 days.

Applications 

Thermal printers print more quietly and usually faster than impact dot matrix printers. They are also smaller, lighter and consume less power, making them ideal for portable and retail applications. Commercial applications of thermal printers include filling station pumps, information kiosks, point of sale systems, voucher printers in slot machines, print on demand labels for shipping and products, and for recording live rhythm strips on hospital cardiac monitors.

Many popular microcomputer systems from the late 1970s and early 1980s had first-party and aftermarket thermal printers available for them, such as the Atari 822 printer for the Atari 8-bit family, the Apple Silentype for the Apple II, and the Alphacom 32 for the ZX Spectrum and ZX81. They often use unusually-sized supplies (10CM wide rolls for the Alphacom 32 for instance) and were often used for making permanent records of information in the computer (graphics, program listings etc.), rather than for correspondence.

Through the 1990s many fax machines used thermal printing technology. Toward the beginning of the 21st century, however, thermal wax transfer, laser, and inkjet printing technology largely supplanted thermal printing technology in fax machines, allowing printing on plain paper.

Thermal printers are commonly used in seafloor exploration and engineering geology due to their portability, speed, and ability to create continuous reels or sheets. Typically, thermal printers found in offshore applications are used to print realtime records of side scan sonar and sub-seafloor seismic imagery. In data processing, thermal printers are sometimes used to quickly create hard copies of continuous seismic or hydrographic records stored in digital SEG Y or XTF form.

Flight progress strips used in air traffic control typically use thermal printing technology. 

The Game Boy Printer, released in 1998, was a small thermal printer used to print out certain elements from some Game Boy games.

In many hospitals in the United Kingdom, many common ultrasound sonogram devices output the results of the scan onto thermal paper. This can cause problems if the parents wish to preserve the image by laminating it, as the heat of most laminators will darken the entire page—this can be tested for beforehand on an unimportant thermal print. An option is to make and laminate a permanent ink duplicate of the image.

Health concerns 

Reports began surfacing of studies in the 2000s finding the oestrogen-related chemical bisphenol A ("BPA") mixed in with thermal (and some other) papers. While , various health and science oriented political pressure organizations such as the Environmental Working Group have pressed for these versions to be pulled from market.

See also 

 Barcode printer
 Dye-sublimation printer
 Line matrix printer
 Line printer
 Label printer
 Label printer applicator
 Lightscribe
 Thermographic printing

References 

Computer printers
Non-impact printing
Thermochromism